Tomáš Zigo (born April 11, 1992) is a Slovak professional ice hockey player who currently plays professionally in Slovakia for HC Slovan Bratislava of the Slovak Extraliga. He participated at the 2017 IIHF World Championship.

Career statistics

Regular season and playoffs

International

Awards and honors

References

External links

1992 births
Living people
Slovak ice hockey forwards
Sportspeople from Banská Bystrica
HC '05 Banská Bystrica players
HC 07 Detva players
HC Slovan Bratislava players
Stadion Hradec Králové players
HC Slavia Praha players
Slovak expatriate ice hockey players in the Czech Republic